Shuaib Adam (born 8 August 1953) is a Kenyan sport shooter. He competed in the 1984, 1988, and 1992 Summer Olympics.

References

1953 births
Living people
Shooters at the 1984 Summer Olympics
Shooters at the 1988 Summer Olympics
Shooters at the 1992 Summer Olympics
Kenyan male sport shooters
Olympic shooters of Kenya